School's Out is a 2018 French social drama thriller film directed by Sébastien Marnier who co-wrote the script with Elise Griffon, based on Christophe Dufossé's 2002 novel of the same name.

Synopsis 
Substitute French teacher, Pierre Hoffman finds himself in charge of teaching an experimental class of twelve gifted students at the renowned Saint Joseph College. The class had witnessed their previous French teacher commit suicide by jumping out of the window, and Pierre is treated with hostility and distrust by the class. The class hall monitors, Apolline and Dimitri, are ringleaders of separate subgroups in the class, and Apolline soon pits herself against Hoffman. Hoffman begins following Apolline and her followers after class and witnesses them engaging in disturbing and violent rituals.

Cast 
 Laurent Lafitte as Pierre Hoffman
 Emmanuelle Bercot as Catherine
 Luàna Bajrami as Apolline
 Victor Bonnel as Dimitri

Production 
In 2017 it was announced that Sébastien Marnier, who had previously directed the 2016 thriller Irréprochable, would helm the project and that Laurent Lafitte and Emmanuelle Bercot had joined the cast. Filming began on June 12, 2017, and a 2018 release date was announced.

Reception 
The film received mixed to positive reviews from critics, and holds  rating on Rotten Tomatoes. The film's cinematography, score, and acting were praised for heightening suspense, while the direction and story were criticized for falling flat in places. EJ Oakley of The Panoptic gave it 4 out of 5 stars, and praised the performances of Lafitte and Bajrami, while noting that the film did not satisfactorily tie up all of its loose ends and subplots.

References

External links 
 

French thriller drama films
2018 films
2010s French films